Kolbotn IL Fotball is a sub-section under the sports club Kolbotn IL from Kolbotn, Norway.  The club started football in 1916 and organized football as a semi-autonomous sub-section in 1960.

The women's team plays in Toppserien and is one of the most successful in Norway with three league titles (2002, 2005 and 2006) and one cup title (2007).

The men's team resides in the 4. divisjon (fifth tier of the Norwegian football league system), after being relegated from the 3. divisjon in 2011 and played in the 2. divisjon as late as 1993.

Recent history 
{|class="wikitable"
|-bgcolor="#efefef"
! Season
! 
! Pos.
! Pl.
! W
! D
! L
! GS
! GA
! P
!Cup
!Notes
|-
|2006
|TS
|align=right bgcolor=gold|1
|align=right|18||align=right|13||align=right|3||align=right|2
|align=right|76||align=right|17||align=right|42
|quarter-final
|
|-
|2007
|TS
|align=right bgcolor=silver|2
|align=right|22||align=right|16||align=right|2||align=right|4
|align=right|71||align=right|18||align=right|50
|bgcolor=gold|winner
|
|-
|2008
|TS
|align=right |4
|align=right|22||align=right|12||align=right|6||align=right|4
|align=right|51||align=right|23||align=right|42
|semi-final
|
|-
|2009
|TS
|align=right bgcolor=cc9966|3
|align=right|22||align=right|16||align=right|2||align=right|4
|align=right|51||align=right|25||align=right|50
|quarter-final
|
|-
|2010
|TS
|align=right bgcolor=cc9966|3
|align=right|22||align=right|15||align=right|2||align=right|5
|align=right|49||align=right|12||align=right|47
|quarter-final
|
|-
|2011
|TS
|align=right bgcolor=cc9966|3
|align=right|22||align=right|16||align=right|3||align=right|3
|align=right|59||align=right|26||align=right|51
|semi-final
|
|-
|2012
|TS
|align=right |5
|align=right|22||align=right|9||align=right|7||align=right|6
|align=right|36||align=right|35||align=right|34
|quarter-final
|
|-
|2013 
|TS
|align=right |6
|align=right|22||align=right|9||align=right|4||align=right|9
|align=right|39||align=right|42||align=right|31
|3rd round
|
|-
|2014 
|TS
|align=right |4
|align=right|22||align=right|13||align=right|0||align=right|9
|align=right|41||align=right|32||align=right|39
|quarter-final
|
|-
|2015 
|TS
|align=right |5
|align=right|22||align=right|9||align=right|5||align=right|8
|align=right|45||align=right|28||align=right|32
|quarter-final
|
|-
|2016 
|TS
|align=right |4
|align=right|22||align=right|12||align=right|4||align=right|6
|align=right|32||align=right|17||align=right|40 
|semi-final
|
|-
|2017 
|TS
|align=right |10
|align=right|22||align=right|4||align=right|3||align=right|15
|align=right|17||align=right|43||align=right|15
|3rd round
|
|-
|2018 
|TS
|align=right |5
|align=right|22||align=right|11||align=right|6||align=right|5
|align=right|34||align=right|35||align=right|39
|quarter-final
|
|-
|2019 
|TS
|align=right |8
|align=right|22||align=right|7||align=right|6||align=right|9
|align=right|35||align=right|39||align=right|27
|quarter-final
|
|-
|2020 
|TS
|align=right |9
|align=right|18||align=right|2||align=right|7||align=right|9
|align=right|18||align=right|29||align=right|13
|1st round
|
|-
|2021 
|TS
|align=right |6
|align=right|18||align=right|6||align=right|2||align=right|10
|align=right|21||align=right|31||align=right|20
|quarter-final
|
|}

Achievements

Women's football
Toppserien
Champions (3): 2002, 2005, 2006
Runners-up (3): 2001, 2003, 2007
Third (4): 2000, 2009, 2010, 2011

 Norwegian Women's Cup
Winners (1): 2007
Runners-up (2): 1998, 2003

UEFA Competitions
 Semi-final in UEFA Women's Cup: 2006 (defeating 1. FFC Frankfurt)

Players

Current squad

Former players

Ada Hegerberg, the first ever recipient of the Ballon d'Or Féminin in 2018, played for Kolbotn in 2010 and 2011.

References

External links
Official website

Football clubs in Norway
Sport in Akershus
Women's football clubs in Norway
1916 establishments in Norway
Association football clubs established in 1916